Glyptodon (from Greek for "grooved or carved tooth": γλυπτός "sculptured" and ὀδοντ-, ὀδούς "tooth") is a genus of glyptodont (an extinct group of large, herbivorous armadillos) that lived from the Pleistocene, around 2.5 million years ago, to the Early Holocene, around 11,000 years ago, in Argentina, Uruguay, Paraguay, Bolivia, Peru, Brazil, and Colombia. It was the first named extinct cingulate and is the type genus of Glyptodontinae, and, or, Glyptodontinae. Many species have been named for the genus, though few are considered valid, and it is one of, if not the, best known genus of glyptodont. Hundreds of specimens have been referred to the genus, but the holotype, or name specimen, of the type species, G. clavipes, was described in 1839 by notable British paleontologist Sir Richard Owen. The holotype used by Owen is a chimera of fossils from 3 different localities, including a molariform used for the name of the genus that actually belongs to Panochthus, making it a species inquirenda.

It was roughly the same size and weight as a Volkswagen Beetle, 800–840 kg (1,760–1,850 lb). With its rounded, bony shell and squat limbs, it superficially resembled a turtle, and the much earlier dinosaurian ankylosaur – providing an example of the convergent evolution of unrelated lineages into similar forms. In 2016 an analysis of Doedicurus mtDNA found it was, in fact, nested within the modern armadillos as the sister group of a clade consisting of Chlamyphorinae and Tolypeutinae. For this reason, glyptodonts and all armadillos but Dasypus were relocated to a new family, Chlamyphoridae, and glyptodonts were demoted from the former family Glyptodontidae to a subfamily.

History and taxonomy

Confusion with Megatherium 

The history and taxonomy of Glyptodon is storied and convoluted, as it involved confusion with other genera, dubious species, and lack of detailed data. The first recorded discovery of Glyptodon was as early as 1814 when Uruguayan priest, scientist, soldier, and later politician Dámaso Antonio Larrañaga (1771-1848) wrote about the discovery of several unusual fossils in his Diario de Historia Natural, which included his descriptions of many new species of ants, birds, mammals, and even one of the first figures of the extinct Megatherium, a genus of giant ground sloth that was named in 1796 by French scientist Georges Cuvier (1769-1832). This was the first recorded discovery of a fossil cingulate or glyptodont. The unusual fossils consisted of a femur, carapace fragments, and a caudal tube (an armored tail covering found in glyptodonts) that he collected from the Pleistocene aged (ca. 2.5-0.011 mya) strata on the banks of the Solís Grande Creek, Uruguay. Larrañaga identified the fossils as those of Dasypus  (Megatherium), believing that Megatherium was a subgenus of Dasypus based on the incorrect referral of glyptodont osteoderms to Megatherium years earlier by Spanish scientist Juan Bautista Bru de Ramón, which misled other scientists to believe that glyptodont fossils were actually those of armored megatheres. Larrañaga wrote to French scientist Auguste St. Hilaire about the discovery, and the letter was reproduced by Cuvier in 1823 in the second volume of his landmark book Recherches sur les ossemens fossiles. Larrañaga's letter stated "I will merely say that I have obtained a femur, which was found in the Rio del Sauce, a branch of the Saulis Grande. It weighs about seven pounds, and may be six or eight inches wide. In all points it resembles the femur of an Armadillo. I will send you one of its scales. The tail, as you have seen, is very short and very large; it also possesses scutes, but they are not arranged in rings, or in whorls." Larrañaga also noted that similar fossils had been found in "analogous strata near Lake Merrim, on the frontier of the Portuguese colonies (southern Brazil)." These fossils were also likely those of glyptodonts, possibly the closely related Hoplophorus. The armored Megatherium theory was further supported later in 1827 when portions of a Glyptodon carapace, as well as a partial femur and some caudal armor, by a Prussian traveler to Montevideo, Uruguay named Mr. Sellow, who sent the carapace to Berlin where it was described by Professor von Weiss, who referred it to Megatherium. The femur and caudal armor were recovered from the Quegnay in northern Uruguay, while the carapace had been found in Arapey. Weiss and other paleontologists noted that the osteoderms closely resembled those of armadillos like Dasypus, but Cuvier's theory was popularized based on the incorrect referral of glyptodont osteoderms Megatherium.

Another work on the armored Megatherium theory was published in 1833 by Berlin scientist E. D'Alton who described more of the material sent by Sellow, including portions of the limbs, manus, and pectoral girdle. D'Alton recognized the great similarities of the fossils to Dasypus and speculated that it was a giant armadillo, stating "the bones, together with the fragments of dermal armour might have belonged to an animal nearly allied to the Armadillos, or perhaps even to a very large, probably extinct, species of Dasypus". Despite this, D'Alton did not erect a new name for the fossils and instead wrote that additional material was necessary to distinguish it from other armadillos. D'Alton did not mention Megatherium or its osteoderms in the paper, but he unwittingly implied that all of the "Megatherium armor" was instead from his armadillo. This theory was supported by Laurillard in 1836, who mentioned that a plaster cast of a large armadillo carapace represented a distinct taxon from Megatherium and that the armor referred to the sloth was instead from an armadillo. 1837 saw the naming of the first glyptodont, Hoplophorus euphractus, when Danish paleontologist Peter Wilhelm Lund published a series of memoirs on the fossils of Lagoa Santa in Brazil, dating to the Pleistocene. The fossils included osteoderms comparable to those described earlier by Larrañaga, as well as teeth, skull fragments, limb bones, and other elements. After 1837, several new genera and species of glyptodonts were named in quick succession by European paleontologists: Chlamydotherium based on Sellow's carapace and Orycterotherium based on Sellow's femur were named by Professor Bonn of Berlin in volume 2 of his book Lethaea Geognostica in 1838, Pachypus by D'Alton in 1839 based on Sellow's 1833 material, Neothoracophorus (originally Thoracophorus but the name was preoccupied by a beetle) in 1889 by Argentine paleontologist Florentino Ameghino based on isolated osteoderms now identified as those of a juvenile Glyptodon from Patagonia, Lepitherium in 1839 by Geoffroy Saint-Hilaire based on Sellow's osteoderms.

Richard Owen and referred species 
In 1838, British diplomat Sir Woodbine Parish (1796-1882) was sent a letter containing an isolated molariform and writing about a discovery of several large fossils from the Matanza River in Buenos Aires, Argentina that dated to the Pleistocene. Parish later collected several more fossils from localities in Las Averias and Villanueva, the latter preserved the most complete skeleton which included a mandible fragment, partial limbs, and unguals of a single individual. They were deposited in Parish's collection at the Royal College of Surgeons in the United Kingdom that year. Some of these fossils were cast at the Natural History Museum, London, but the original fossils were destroyed after German aerial bombing raids hit the college during World War II from 1940-41. The genus name Glyptodon was first mentioned by Richard Owen (1804-1892), one of the most influential British naturalists of the Victorian Era, writing a chapter about the animal and publishing a reconstruction of its' skeleton in the book Buenos Ayres, and the provinces of the Rio de La Plata: their present state, trade, and debt in 1838. However, Glyptodon was not properly described until 1839 where Owen dubbed the fossils found by Parish, erroneously believing they were all from the same individual, Glyptodon clavipes and the molariform was designated the lectotype. Later study found the molariform to actually be from another glyptodont, Panochthus, and the Villanueva individual was designated the lectotype by Robert Hoffstetter in 1955. The Las Averias individual consists of a carapace that was only mentioned in Owen's description, but was used in later reconstructions of the animal and has since been lost. An issue with the lectotype of G. clavipes is that the material is undiagnostic and indistinguishable from other Glyptodon species and even Glyptotherium, making it dubious. Cuadrelli et al (2018) designated the species a species inquirenda due to this issue and more analyses are necessary. In 1860, Signor Maximo Terrero collected a partial skeleton, including a skull and carapace, of G. clavipes from the River Salado in southern Buenos Aires, Argentina and dated to the Pleistocene. These fossils were also sent to the Royal College of Surgeons, where they were described in detail by British paleontologist Thomas Henry Huxley (1825-1895) in 1865 during a comprehensize review of the taxon. This skeleton was also destroyed during WWII, but Huxley published several illustrations that presented great amounts of new information on the taxon.

Later in 1845, many more fossils found by Parish from Pleistocene layers in Argentina were named as new species of Glyptodon by Owen: G. ornatus, G. reticulatus, G. tuberculatus, and G. clavicaudatus in 1847. Of these additional species, only G. reticulatus is still considered a valid species of Glyptodon as G. ornatus was reassigned to the genus Neosclerocalyptus, G. tuberculatus to Panochthus, and G. clavicaudatus to Doedicurus. G. reticulatus was named on the basis of several dorsal carapace fragments that had also been recovered from the Matanza River, but they lack detailed locality information and the fossils too were destroyed during WWII. The fragments were cast by the NHMUK as well and the fossils were dated to the Pleistocene. Other paleontologists also started erecting names for Glyptodon species after the 1840s, but many of them are now seen as dubious, species inquirenda, or synonymous with previously named species. Par L. Nodot described a new genus and species of glyptodont in 1857, Schistopleurum typus, on the basis of a caudal tube found in the Pampas of Argentina, but it has since been synonymized with G. reticulatus. Another species now seen as valid was described in 1881 by Argentine paleontologist Florentino Ameghino (1853-1911) called G. munizi on the basis of several osteoderms found in the Ensenadan of Arroyo del Medio, San Nicolás, Argentina. For many years the taxon was only known from the fragmentary holotype, but skull and complete carapace material of the species was later described in detail in 2006 that cemented its validity. German zoologist Hermann Burmeister described several Glyptodon fossils in the 1860s, many of them he named as new species of Glyptodon itself or the synonym Schistopleurum, all of which are now synonyms of Glyptodon and its species. In 1908, Florentino Ameghino named another species of Glyptodon, G. chapalmalensis, based on a carapace fragment that he had collected from the Atlantic Coast of Buenos Aires Province that dated to the Chapadmalalan. In 1932, A. Castellanos made a new genus for G. chapalmalensis, Paraglyptodon, which later included another species, P. uquiensis, that was based on more complete specimens that had been collected from Uquía, Argentina between 1909 and 1912. The former species is dubious , but likely not Glyptodon based on its age. P. uquiensis has been synonymized with Glyptodon and is possibly a valid species, though further analysis is necessary to settle its status.

Reassesment and Glyptotherium 
In the 1950s, Argentine paleontologist Alfredo Castellanos (1893-1975) erected new generic names for several species of Glyptodon, the first being Glyptocoileus and second of these being Glyptopedius in 1953 that was made for the species G. elongatus that had been named by Robert Burmeister in 1866 on the basis of a single carapace, though it is now invalid. Castellanos also referred the species G. reticulatus to the genus, but the genus is now seen as synonymous with Glyptodon. Glyptocoileus was also named by Castellanos in Another glyptodont genus was erected in 1976 named Heteroglyptodon genuarioi by F. L. Roselli based on an incomplete skeleton that had been collected from the Pleistocene aged Libertad Formation in Nueva Palmira, Uruguay, but it has since been found to be an indeterminate specimen of Glyptodon. Several Glyptodon fossils from Pleistocene deposits in Colombia were described in 2012, extending the known range of the genus north greatly. A novel Glyptodon species was described in 2020 called G. jatunkhirkhi by several authors led by Argentine zoologist Francisco Cuadrelli on the basis of an individual preserving a nearly complete carapace, several caudal rings, and a pelvis that had been collected from Yamparaez, 24 km southeast of the Bolivian city of Sucre. The strata they were found in was made up of fluvial, sandy sédiments that dated to the Late Pleistocene from elevations as high as  2500–4100 meters above sea level. Several additional paratypes were referred to the species from other Late Pleistocene sites in Eastern Cordillera, Bolivia including a nearly complete skull and several osteoderms. In a phylogenetic analysis conducted by Cuadrelli et al., 2020, G. jatunkhirki was recovered as the most basal Glyptodon species, despite being the same age as the more derived species G. clavipes. Reassesment of Glyptodon species began in the late 20th and early 21st centuries, with various hypotheses developing on the number of valid species. Numbers varied, with some authors considering up to 4 species valid, while  phylogenetic analyses in 2018 and 2020 only found the species: G. reticulatus, G. munizi, and G. jatunkhirkhi definitively valid; G. clavipes and G. uquiensis as species inquirendas.

Fossils from North America were also described and referred to Glyptodon starting in 1875, when civil engineers J. N. Cuatáparo and Santiago Ramírez collected a skull, nearly complete carapace, and associated postcranial skeleton of a glyptodont from a drainage canal near Tequixquiac, Mexico, the fossils coming from the Rancholabrean Pleistocene. These fossils were the first found of glyptodonts in North America and were named as a new species of Glyptodon, G. mexicanum, but the fossils have since been lost and the species was synonymized with Glyptotherium cylindricum. Several other North American glyptodont species were named throughout the late 19th-early 20th century, typically on fragmentary osteoderms. All North American and Central American fossils of glyptodonts have since been referred to the closely related genus Glyptotherium, which was named in 1903 by American paleontologist Henry Fairfield Osborn.

Taxonomy 
Glyptodon is the type genus and namesake of Glyptodontinae, an extinct subfamily of large, heavily armored armadillos that first evolved in the Late Eocene (ca. 33.5 mya) and went extinct in the Early Holocene during the Quaternary extinction event (ca. 7,000 years ago). Glyptodontinae was classified in its own family or even superfamily until in 2016, when ancient DNA was extracted from the carapace of a 12,000 year old Doedicurus (a large, mace-clubbed glyptodont) specimen, and a nearly complete mitochondrial genome was reconstructed (76x coverage). Comparisons with those of modern armadillos revealed that glyptodonts diverged from tolypeutine and chlamyphorine armadillos approximately 34 million years ago in the late Eocene. This prompted moving them from their own family, Glyptodontidae, to the subfamily Glyptodontinae within the extant Chlamyphoridae. Based on this and the fossil record, glyptodonts would have evolved their characteristic shape and large size (gigantism) quite rapidly, possibly in response to the cooling, drying climate and expansion of open savannas. Chylamyphoridae is a group in the order Cingulata, which includes all extant armadillos in addition to other fossil groups like Pachyarmatheriidae and Pampatheridae. Cingulata is itself within the basal mammal group Xenarthra, which includes an array of American mammal groups like Vermilingua (anteaters) and Folivora (sloths and ground sloths) in the order Pilosa. The following phylogenetic analysis was conducted by Frédéric Delsuc and colleagues in 2016 and represents the phylogeny of Cingulata using ancient DNA from Doedicurus to determine the position of it and other Glyptodonts:

The internal phylogeny of Glyptodontinae is convoluted and in a flux, with many species and families erected on the basis of fragmentary or undiagnostic material that lacks comprehensive review. It is usually considered its own family, but DNA analyses have reduced it to a subfamily with tribes instead of its own subfamilies. One tribe, Glyptodontini (typically labeled Glyptodontinae) is a group of younger, larger glyptodonts that evolved in the Middle Miocene (ca. 13 mya) with Boreostemma, but split into 2 genera, Glyptodon in the south and Glyptotherium in the north, though Glyptotherium also lived in some areas of South America like Venezuela and eastern Brazil. Glyptodontini is often recovered as more basal to most other glyptodonts like Doedicurus, Hoplophorus, and Panochthus. Glyptodontini is distinguishable from other groups in that it has large, conical tubercular osteoderms absent or only present on the caudal notch on the posterior end of the carapace, different ornamentation of the armor on the carapace than the tail, and a Labio-lingual axis of the Mf1 that is less than that of the antero-posterior axis. The sister taxon, or closest relative(s) of another taxon, to Glyptodon is the genus Glyptotherium, which lived at the same intervals as Glyptodon for much of its existence. Glyptotherium is nearly identical to Glyptodon in many aspects, so much so that the first fossils of Glyptotherium to be described were misidentified as those of Glyptodon.Below is the phylogenetic analysis conducted by Cuadrelli et al., 2020 of Glyptodontinae, with Glyptodontidae as a family instead of subfamily, that focuses on advanced Glyptodonts:

Geography and habitat 

Glyptodon originated in South America. Their remains have been found in Brazil, Uruguay, and Argentina. Of the Glyptodon species attributed to remains discovered in Brazil, G. clavipes had the largest range. Its distribution includes north, northeast, and southeast Brazil. G. reticulatus remains have only been found in southern Brazil.

Due to poor morphological and taxonomic understanding, many of the species of the genus and their ranges have not been identified. Countries such as Bolivia, Paraguay and western Uruguay have been recently discovered to have been inhabited by members of Glyptodontidae. Material previously assigned to Glyptodon in northeast Brazil has been reassigned to  Glyptotherium, restricting the distribution of Glyptodon to the southern region of Brazil. However, two osteoderms with characteristics similar to those of Glyptodon have been recently found in Sergipe state in the northeast, suggesting that both genera occurred in this region during the Pleistocene.

The environments range from forested areas, sub-forested, to warm and humid, while some have become accustomed to open, cold areas where grasslands are the most common. The occurrence of the genus has also been observed in the southwestern part of the Amazon basin, which suggests that the wide diversity of the genus was due to the diverse climates within its range.

During the Great American Interchange, a set of migrations that occurred after North and South America were connected by the rising of the volcanic Isthmus of Panama, Glyptodon migrated into Central America as far as Guatemala. A closely related genus, Glyptotherium, reached the southern region of the modern U.S. about 2.5 million years ago.

Paleobiology

Feeding and diet 
Two main groups of glyptodonts can be distinguished by their feeding habits. Smaller-sized early Miocene propalaehoplophorids had narrow muzzles, while larger post-Miocene glyptodonts developed wider muzzles. The smaller glyptodonts were selective feeders, while the larger glyptodonts were bulk feeders. However, because of their body form and fusion of the cervical vertebrae, all members of Glyptodon would have needed to forage near the ground. Their craniomandibular joint limited their jaw to side-to-side movement.

The feeding habits of Glyptodon, based on their jaw morphology, were herbivorous. Glyptodon had an "elaboration of the osteodentine ridges in their jaw that provided an effective grinding mill, causing the food particles to be pushed and sheared through constant motion of the mandible, allowing Glyptodon to consume their dietary needs." They had a well-developed snout musculature, along with a mobile neck region that helped them secure food.

Like most other xenarthrans, glyptodonts had lower energy requirements than most other mammals. They could survive with lower intake rates than other herbivores with similar mass.

Glyptodon grazed near water sources such as rivers and lakes. Based on stable isotope analysis, it is evident that its diet consisted primarily of dicotyledonous trees and monocotyledonous grasses.

Ontogeny 
In 2009, a partial skeleton of a prenatal individual of Glyptodon was described that had been found inside of the pelvic region of a carapace of an adult. The skeleton had been collected from the Pleistocene aged deposits in the Tarija Valley of Bolivia and included a partial skull, partial mandible, and fragments from the scapulae and femora. The skeleton is the only known prenatal specimen of a glyptodont and is one of the most complete specimens of an immature Glyptodon known, though dozens of isolated osteoderms from juveniles are known. The preserved skull measures only 51 mm long, but still bears many characteristics of Glyptodon such as a subtriangular naris, a lateral margin on the naris that forms an acute angle of 30 degrees, oval infraorbital foramina, and several other traits. However, the mandible differs in that the ascending ramus is at a 90 degree angle in contrast to the 60-70 degree angles preserved in adults. Interestingly, this mandibular morphology is alike to that in some specimens of Glyptotherium cylindricum.

In the osteoderms of juvenile Glyptodon reticulatus, the central figures are larger than the peripheral osteoderms. These central figures are planar, sometimes even concave, and elevated compared to the peripherals. The peripherals in younger individuals are also less distinct and bear weakly marked or absent furrows (grooves that separate osteoderms). On the other hand, peripherals and central figures of adults are similarly sized, distinct, and of similar heights.

Sexual Dimorphism 
No evidence of sexual dimorphism in Glyptodon has been described, but it has been observed in the close relative Glyptotherium based on fossils found in Pliocene deposits in Arizona. In the genus, the caudal aperture (large conical osteoderms that protect the base of the tail) of males and females differ in that the marginal osteoderms of males are much more conical and convex than those of females. Even in the carapaces of newborn Glyptotherium, the marginal osteoderms are either conical or flat, which enables their sex to be determined.

Eyesight 

Rod monochromacy is a rare condition characterized by the absence of cone photoreceptor cells in the eyes of vertebrates. It results in colorblindness and low acuity vision in dim-light conditions and blindness in bright-light conditions. Xenarthrans most likely only used vision at night, during twilight, and while in burrows. However, the understory of South America's rainforests may have been dark enough during the day to facilitate limited vision for species that dwelled there. Extinct glyptodonts' tough carapace and large body size might have compensated for their inability to see approaching predators.

Intraspecific combat 
Glyptodonts are believed to have taken part in intraspecific fighting. Zoologists presume that since the tail of Glyptodon was very flexible and had rings of bony plates, it was used as a weapon in fights. Although its tail could be used for defense against predators, evidence suggests that the tail of Glyptodon was primarily for attacks on its own kind. A G. reticulatus fossil displays damage done on the surface of its carapace. A group of zoologists calculated the amount of force required to break the carapace of Glyptodon. The calculation showed that Glyptodon tails would be able to break the carapace. Glyptodon likely fought each other to settle territorial or mating disputes, much like male-to-male fighting among deer using their antlers.

Description 

Like the extant armadillos and all other glyptodonts, Glyptodon had a large, bony carapace that covered much of its torso, as well as smaller cephalic armor covering the roof of its head, akin to that in turtles. The carapace was composed of hundreds of small, hexagonal osteoderms (armored structures made of bone), with Glyptodon dorsal carapaces preserving a total of 1,800 osteoderms each. This armor differed greatly from extant armadillos in that it was entirely immobile, which gave it lots of sturdy protection. In the axial skeleton, glyptodonts had strongly fused vertebrae and pelves completely connected to the carapace, traits convergently evolved in turtles. The large tails of glyptodonts likely served as a counterbalance to the rest of the body and Glyptodon's caudal armor ended in a blunt tube that was composed of 2 fused tubes, in contrast to those of mace-tailed glyptodonts like Neosclerocalyptus and Doedicurus. Glyptodon was very graviportal and had short limbs that are very similar to those in other glyptodonts, the limb anatomy of Glyptodon is indistinguishable from that of Glyptotherium. The digits of Glyptotherium are very stout and adapted for weight-bearing, though some preserve large claw sheaths that had an intermediate morphology between claws and hooves. During the Pleistocene, the diversity of glyptodonts diminished but increased in size, with the largest known glyptodont, Doedicurus, evolving in the Pleistocene. Glyptodon sizes vary between species and individuals. This size difference could be due to G. clavipes being a Pampean species that lived in open, lowland habitats while the Andean species lived in high mountain habitats that could only support smaller species. A similar situation was present in Peruvian Megatheriines, which evolved smaller sizes to adapt to the mountain habitats of the Andes.

Skull, mandible, and dentition 
Glyptodont dentition lacks caniniforms or incisiforms and instead have all hypsodont (high crowned teeth adapted for grazing) molariforms, the cheek teeth are some of the most hypsodont and homodont known from terrestrial mammals. Glyptodont skulls have several unique features; the maxilla and palatine are enlarged vertically to make space for the molariforms, while the braincase is brachycephalic, short and flat. Dermal armor wasn't restricted to the carapace and tail, as the skull roof was protected by a "cephalic shield" made of osteoderms. Some paleontologists have proposed that Glyptotherium and some glyptodonts also had a proboscis or large snout similar to those in elephants and tapirs, but few have accepted this hypothesis. Glyptodon is known from dozens of skulls, giving it a comprehensive knowledge on its cranial anatomy.

The nasal passage was reduced with heavy muscle attachments for some unknown purpose. Some have speculated that the muscle attachments were for a proboscis, or trunk, much like that of a tapir or elephant. The lower jaws were very deep and helped support massive chewing muscles to help chew coarse fibrous plants. Teeth resembled those of an armadillo, but were fluted on each side by deep grooves. The anterior teeth were compressed, while the posterior teeth were cylindrical. A distinctive bar of bone projects downwards on the cheek, extending over the lower jaw, perhaps providing an anchor for powerful snout muscles. Another suggestion, made by A.E. Zurita and colleagues, is that the large nasal sinuses could be correlated with the cold arid climate of Pleistocene South America.

In Glyptodon and many other glyptodonts, the roof of the skull was covered by a shield composed of polygonal, irregular osteoderms that were variable in size and ankylosed together to form a robust cephalic shield that had a smoothly convex exterior surface without ornamentation. Each osteoderm has a rugose and slightly convex dorsal surface, with ornamentation pattern defined by a central figure, slightly elevated and surrounded by an area without peripheral figures or foramina. Sutures separating osteoderms are well marked, as in Panochthus.

Vertebrae and pelvis 
Glyptodon preserves 7 cervical vertebrae, the first 3 cervicals were fused together while the rest of the cervicals were free except for the 7th. The 7th cervical and the first 2 dorsal vertebrae were fused together into a trivertebral, a broad, flat bone with very small spinous processes (projections from a vertebra) and large articular surfaces that were used to hold ribs. All of the other 13 vertebrae in the spinal column were fused into one long continuous tunnel that is not seen outside of glyptodonts in Mammalia, some of these vertebrae were so tightly fused that the segments of them cannot be discerned. The centra of these vertebra were curved, thin bony plates that created a cylinder to support the carapace and the shape of the animal. Spinous processes in these vertebrae are also heavily reduced, with some being only a thin blade of bone ankylosed with other vertebrae. Sacral vertebrae in Glyptodon are also fused and 13 in number, which preserve very unusual oval-shaped, thin, and slightly concave ends on the centra. The pelves are also unusual, as they preserve giant ilia and are fused to the rest of the skeleton. Glyptodon's caudal vertebrae were the most flexible in the skeleton, likely to be used for protection against threats.

Carapace and osteoderms 

Glyptodon and other glyptodonts' most distinctive characteristic is the large dorsal carapace composed of interconnected osteoderms that covered much of the dorsum. It was covered by a protective shell composed of more than 1,000 2.5 cm-thick bony plates, called osteoderms or scutes. Each species of glyptodont had its own unique osteoderm pattern and shell type. With this protection, they were armored like turtles. Unlike most turtles, glyptodonts could not withdraw their heads, but instead had a bony cap on the top of their skull. Even the tail of Glyptodon had a ring of bones for protection. Such a massive shell needed considerable support, evidenced by features such as fused vertebrae, short but massive limbs, and a broad shoulder girdle.

The anatomy of different Glyptodon species varies greatly, mostly in the species G. jatunkhirkhi which is more similar to Glyptotherium in some ways. The carapace of Glyptodon was strongly elongated compared to those of Boreostemma and Glyptotherium, with the carapace being relatively 65% longer than the former and 14% than the latter. The antero-posterior dorsal profile of the carapace was convex and its posterior half was higher than the anterior. The apex of the carapace was slightly displaced posteriorly in most Glyptodon species, while in Glyptotherium and Glyptodon jatunkhirkhi it was at the center of the midline. The carapace was regularly convex in most species of Glyptodon and was arched subtly, while Glyptotherium & Glyptodon jatunkhirkhi’s has a very arched back and convex pre-iliac and concave post-iliac, giving it a saddle-like overhang over the tail. In Glyptodon, the top-bottom height of the carapace represents 60% of its total length, whereas in Glyptotherium it is taller at ca. 70%. The ventral margins of the carapace in Glyptotherium is much more rectangular and less convex than in Glyptodon. Glyptodon osteoderms in the antero-lateral regions of the carapace are strongly ankylosed, giving them little flexibility, while in Glyptotherium they are less ankylosed and more flexible. The osteoderms of the caudal aperture are more conical in Glyptodon and more rounded in Glyptotherium, though in the latter the anatomy of the caudal aperture osteoderms varies by sex while in Glyptodon it varies by age. The caudal aperture also differs between the two in that the angle between the ventral plane of the carapace and the caudal aperture is ca.100°-135° in Glyptodon, but only ca. 90° in Glyptotherium. The caudal aperture is also more vertically oriented in the latter genus, while in Glyptotheirum it is angled posteriorily. Although frequently used to differentiate the two taxa, Glyptodon and Glyptotherium have similar osteoderm morphologies that differ only in several areas. Both genera have tall, thick osteoderms compared to those of many other glyptodonts such as Hoplophorus and Neosclerocalyptus. Glyptodon sometimes preserve a "rossette" pattern, where the osteoderm's central figure is surrounded by a row of peripheral figures, while others lack them completely. G. reticulatus varies from a complete rosette pattern to a reticular surface, which has convex central and peripheral figures. Glyptotherium however always preserve rosettes. The central and radial sulci are deeper and broader in Glyptodon (ca. 4–6 mm) than in Glyptotherium (ca. 1–2.4 mm). The osteoderms in Glyptodon and Glyptotherium have 5-11 peripheral figures, rugose exposed surfaces, and heights up to 47 mm.

Osteoderms on the ventral side of the body were first mentioned by German paleontologist Robert Burmeister in 1864, postulating that there was a ventral plastron like in turtles based on evidence of small armor in the dermis. This theory has since been disproven, but evidence of small ossicles in the skin and dermis has recently been described from various regions of the body such as the ventral, face, and hindlimbs.

Before the Pleistocene, Glyptodon’s osteoderms were attached by syntoses and were found in double or triple rows on the front and sides of the carapace's edges, as well as in the tail armor and cephalic shield. The carapace's osteoderms were conical with a rounded point, while the ones on the tail were just conical. The sulci between these raised structures were deep and wide with parallel lines.

In the early 2000s, the presence of osteoderms on Glyptodon’s face, hind legs, and underside was confirmed in several species. The fossils with these characteristics were from the Pleistocene. These small to medium-sized ossicles were actually embedded in the dermis and did not connect in a pattern. The appearance of this new trait coincides with the arrival of North American predators in South America as part of the Great American Interchange, a period after the formation of the Isthmus of Panama around 3 mya that saw southern animals migrate north and vice versa. For this reason, some scientists hypothesize that the osteoderms developed as a defensive/offensive mechanism. This belief is furthered by the discovery of fractured dorsal armor, which implies that Glyptodon had been in physical conflict with other species.

Tail 

Glyptodon clavipes had a tail covered in free bony rings of dermal structures that made for a strong, flexible, and mobile appendix. This enabled it to use the muscles along its tail to powerfully swing it. (The rings in other glyptodonts' tails were fused together, making the tail a single piece of rigid bone; an example of this is Doedicurus.)

In the caudal (tail) anatomy, Glyptodon had very primitive anatomy for a glyptodont in that it had mobile eight or nine caudal rings of fused large, conical, osteoderms that enclosed the tail that terminated at the end of the tail with a short caudal tube that was made up of two fused caudal rings. Caudal rings were composed of two or three rows of pentagonal osteoderms that transitioned from flat, slightly convex in the posterior rings to conical tubercles by the third caudal ring. The more posterior the rings were, the larger they were, with the exception of the 2nd ring which was the largest and 1st complete ring in the series, creating a cone shaped tail. The distal/ending scutes are larger, and their free margins are rounded producing a fanlike shape. Most of the osteoderms of the distal row (some individuals preserving up to 12) bear prominent conical morphology. This is in strong contrast to more advanced glyptodonts like Doedicurus and Panochthus, which had completely fused tails that formed an inflexible mace or club. The caudal tube at the distalmost end of the tail is cylinder shaped with smaller conical osteoderms and is much smaller proportionally in Glyptodon than in Glyptotherium. In Glyptotherium, this caudal tube represents ca. 20% of the total length of the caudal armor, whereas in Glyptodon, this structure represents 13% of the total length. In Glyptodon, the caudal armor length represents circa 30-40% of the dorsal carapace's total length, whereas in Glyptotherium, this value is greater at around 50%.

Glyptodon may have used their tails in competition for resources and also as an ornament when competing for sexual partners.

Predation 

Glyptodon may have been preyed upon by animals such as the saber-toothed cats Smilodon and Homotherium, the giant short-faced bear Arctotherium, dire wolves and terror birds.

The evidence for predation on glyptodonts by humans is very scarce, limited to a Pliocene skull (Glyptotherium) in North America and some latest Pleistocene-early Holocene specimens in South America, with signs of human consumption.

Extinction 
Some evidence suggests that humans drove glyptodonts to extinction. Hunters may have used the shells of dead animals as shelters in inclement weather. Evidence from the Campo Laborde and La Moderna archaeological sites in the Argentine Pampas suggests that Glyptodon'''s relative Doedicurus and another glyptodont survived until the Early Holocene, coexisting with humans for a minimum of 4,000 years. This overlap provides support for models showing the South American Pleistocene extinctions resulted from a combination of climatic change and anthropogenic causes. These sites have been interpreted as ones used for butchering of megafauna (Megatherium and Doedicurus''); however, some of the chronology has been problematic and controversial, due to poor preservation of the collagen used for dating.

See also

References

External links 
 

Armadillos
Prehistoric cingulates
Prehistoric placental genera
Pleistocene xenarthrans
Pleistocene mammals of North America
Pleistocene Guatemala
Fossils of Guatemala
Pleistocene mammals of South America
Pleistocene Argentina
Fossils of Argentina
Pleistocene Brazil
Fossils of Brazil
Pleistocene Paraguay
Fossils of Paraguay
Pleistocene Peru
Fossils of Peru
Pleistocene Uruguay
Fossils of Uruguay
Pleistocene Venezuela
Fossils of Venezuela
Fossil taxa described in 1839
Taxa named by Richard Owen